Provodina is a village in the municipality of Herceg Novi, Montenegro.

The settlement of Provodina consists of several hamlets, the most important of which are Njivice and Žvinje. It is close to Igalo and has access to the Adriatic Sea.

Demographics
According to the 2011 census, its population was 822.

References

Populated places in Herceg Novi Municipality
Populated places in Bay of Kotor
Mediterranean port cities and towns in Montenegro
Coastal towns in Montenegro